The QMJHL Humanitarian of the Year Award is awarded annually by the Quebec Major Junior Hockey League to one player for humanitarianism and community involvement. The player also receives a plaque which is known as the Wittnauer Plaque, and formerly known as the Karcher Plaque from 1992 to 1997.

Winners

External links
 

Humanitarian and service awards
Quebec Major Junior Hockey League trophies and awards